Sayur asem or sayur asam is an Indonesian vegetable soup. It is a popular Southeast Asian dish originating from Sundanese cuisine, consisting of vegetables in tamarind soup. 

The sweet and sour flavour of this dish is considered refreshing and very compatible with fried or grilled dishes, including salted fish, ikan goreng, ayam goreng and lalapan, a kind of vegetable salad usually served raw but can also be cooked, and is usually eaten with steamed rice and sambal terasi chili paste. 

The origin of the dish can be traced to the Sundanese people of West Java, Banten and the Jakarta region. It is well known to belong within Sundanese cuisine and the Betawi daily diet.

Ingredients
Common ingredients are peanuts, young jackfruit, young leaves and unpeeled seeds of melinjo, bilimbi, chayote, and long beans, all cooked in tamarind-based soups and sometimes enriched with beef stock. Quite often, the recipe also includes corn.

Variants
Several variations exist including sayur asem Jakarta (a version from the Betawi people of Jakarta), sayur asem kangkung (a version which includes water spinach), sayur asem ikan asin (includes salted fish, usually snakehead murrel), sayur asem talas (with taro and its leaves) and sayur asem kacang merah (consists of red beans and green beans in tamarind and beef stock). The Karo version of sayur asem is made using torch ginger buds and, more importantly, the sour-tasting seed pods. Sayur asem rembang is a vegetable soup with a sour flavor.

See also

 Tamarind juice
 Sinigang
 List of Indonesian soups
 List of soups
 List of vegetable soups

References

Sundanese cuisine
Indonesian soups
Vegetarian dishes of Indonesia
Vegetable dishes of Indonesia